Impatiens parviflora (small balsam, or small-flowered touch-me-not) is a species of annual herbaceous plants in the family Balsaminaceae, native to some areas of Eurasia, naturalized elsewhere and found in damp shady places. Impatiens parviflora can grow in sandy, loamy, and clay soils and prefer moist soil.

Ecology
Impatiens parviflora flowers are pollinated by insects.

Uses
Impatiens parviflora has many uses. If cooked, the leaves are completely edible. The seeds can be consumed either raw or cooked. Impatiens parviflora is also used as a treatment for warts, ringworm, and nettle stings. It is also used as a hair rinse to relieve an itchy scalp.

References

External links
Impatiens parviflora in Flora of China

parviflora
Flora of Xinjiang
Flora of Kazakhstan
Flora of Kyrgyzstan
Flora of Mongolia
Flora of Russia
Flora of Europe